Football in Namibia is governed by the Namibia Football Association. The Namibia Premier League is the main domestic league. The Namibia national football team has never qualified for the FIFA World Cup, but has twice been runner up in the COSAFA Cup. They qualified for two Africa Cups of Nations, in 1998 and 2008, being eliminated in the first round both times.

2008 Africa Cup of Nations
In September 2007, the national team qualified for just their second ever African Cup of Nations appearance, which took place in Ghana. The Namibian squad was defeated 5-1 by Morocco in their first game, 0-1 by host Ghana in their 2nd and tied Guinea one all and thus did not earn a spot in the quarterfinal round.

Notable Namibian footballers
 Collin Benjamin
 Henrico Botes
 Floris Diergaardt
 Richard Gariseb
 George Hummel
 Laurence Kaapama
 Rudi Louw
 Robert Nauseb
 Jamuovandu Ngatjizeko
 Ryan Nyambe
 Sydney Plaatjies
 Paulus Shipanga
 Razundara Tjikuzu

See also
 Sport in Namibia

References